The 1960–61 FIBA European Champions Cup was the fourth season of the European top-tier level professional basketball club competition FIBA European Champions Cup (now called EuroLeague). It was won by CSKA Moscow, after they defeated Rīgas ASK, the reigning three-time defending champions, and the first major dynasty of European professional club basketball . CSKA lost the first game 66–61, but won the second 87–62, and thus became the fourth straight European champions from the Soviet Union League.

Competition system
24 teams. European national domestic league champions, plus the then current FIBA European Champions Cup title holders only, playing in a tournament system. The Finals were a two-game home and away aggregate.

First round

|}

Second round

|}

*The second leg was cancelled after the Yugoslavian police refused to guarantee the safety of the Belgian team, whose members received serious threats upon arrival to Belgrade, as a result of the mysterious death of Patrice Lumumba, Prime Minister of Congo, on February 11, 1961. The Soviet government, an ally to Lumumba, blamed the Belgian secret service as the instigator of his murder in the former Belgian colony, and this translated into several riots in the communist countries against the Belgian interests. Since the second leg could not be played, Antwerpse received a 2–0 w.o. in this game and qualified for the next round.

Automatically qualified to the quarter finals
 Rīgas ASK (title holder)

Quarterfinals

|}

Semifinals

|}

Finals

|}

1st leg:Daugava Stadion, Rīga, 14 July 1961; Attendance:8,000

2nd leg:Lenin Stadion, Moscow, 22 July 1961; Attendance:15,000

Awards

FIBA European Champions Cup Finals Top Scorer
 Viktor Zubkov ( CSKA Moscow)

References

External links
 1960–61 FIBA European Champions Cup
1960–61 FIBA European Champions Cup 
1960–61 FIBA European Champions Cup
Champions Cup 1960–61 Line-ups and Stats

FIBA
1960-61